Several countries and many Royal Air Force units operated the Hawker Hart and its variants.

Operators

Hawker Hart

Afghan Air Force received eight aircraft in 1937.

Royal Canadian Air Force

Royal Egyptian Air Force

Estonian Air Force received eight Harts with interchangeable wheel and float undercarriages in 1932. They remained in use until the Soviet occupation of Estonia  in 1940.

Finnish Air Force received five ex-Swedish Air Force Harts in 1940.

 British India
Royal Indian Air Force
 No. 1 Squadron, Indian Air Force
 No. 2 Squadron, Indian Air Force
 No. 1 Service Flying Training School, Ambala

Imperial Iranian Air Force

South African Air Force received over 50 ex-RAF Harts from 1937.
 1 Squadron SAAF

 Southern Rhodesian Air Force
 No. 1 Squadron

Royal Swedish Air Force received four Hawker-built Harts powered by Bristol Pegasus radial engines in 1934, with 42 more Pegasus powered Harts built under licence.

Royal Air Force
 No. 5 Squadron RAF June 1940–February 1941
 No. 6 Squadron RAF October 1935–March 1938
 No. 11 Squadron RAF February 1932–July 1939
 No. 12 Squadron RAF January 1931–October 1936
 No. 15 Squadron RAF June 1934–March 1936
 No. 17 Squadron RAF October 1935–May 1936
 No. 18 Squadron RAF November 1931–May 1936
 No. 24 Squadron RAF
 No. 27 Squadron RAF 1939–1940
 No. 33 Squadron RAF February 1930–March 1938
 No. 39 Squadron RAF November 1931–July 1939
 No. 40 Squadron RAF November 1935–March 1936
 No. 45 Squadron RAF September 1935–January 1936
 No. 57 Squadron RAF October 1931–May 1936
 No. 60 Squadron RAF
 No. 81 Squadron RAF
 No. 142 Squadron RAF
 No. 173 Squadron RAF
 No. 235 Squadron RAF
 No. 237 Squadron RAF
 No. 296 Squadron RAF
 No. 500 Squadron RAF
 No. 501 Squadron RAF
 No. 502 Squadron RAF
 No. 503 Squadron RAF
 No. 504 Squadron RAF
 No. 510 Squadron RAF
 No. 600 Squadron RAF
 No. 601 Squadron RAF
 No. 602 Squadron RAF
 No. 603 Squadron RAF
 No. 604 Squadron RAF
 No. 605 Squadron RAF
 No. 609 Squadron RAF
 No. 610 Squadron RAF
 No. 611 Squadron RAF
Fleet Air Arm
 780 Naval Air Squadron
 781 Naval Air Squadron

Royal Yugoslav Air Force - Four Harts were loaned to Yugoslavia in 1931.

Hawker Audax
 British India
Royal Indian Air Force
 No. 1 Squadron, Indian Air Force
 No. 2 Squadron, Indian Air Force
 No. 3 Squadron, Indian Air Force
 No. 4 Squadron, Indian Air Force
 No. 1 Service Flying Training School, Ambala

 Royal Canadian Air Force

4 Squadron, Royal Egyptian Air Force

Iraqi Air Force

Imperial Iranian Air Force

 Southern Rhodesian Air Force
 No. 1 Squadron

 Royal Air Force
 No. 2 Squadron RAF
 No. 4 Squadron RAF
 No. 5 Squadron RAF in India
 No. 13 Squadron RAF
 No. 16 Squadron RAF
 No. 20 Squadron RAF
 No. 24 Squadron RAF
 No. 26 Squadron RAF
 No. 28 Squadron RAF
 No. 52 Squadron RAF
 No. 61 Squadron RAF
 No. 63 Squadron RAF
 No. 77 Squadron RAF
 No. 105 Squadron RAF
 No. 114 Squadron RAF
 No. 144 Squadron RAF
 No. 146 Squadron RAF
 No. 148 Squadron RAF
 No. 173 Squadron RAF
 No. 208 Squadron RAF
 No. 211 Squadron RAF
 No. 226 Squadron RAF
 No. 237 Squadron RAF
 No. 267 Squadron RAF
 No. 615 Squadron RAF
 Fleet Air Arm
 780 Naval Air Squadron

Hawker Demon

Royal Australian Air Force
 No. 1 Squadron RAAF
 No. 2 Squadron RAAF
 No. 3 Squadron RAAF
 No. 4 Squadron RAAF
 No. 12 Squadron RAAF
 No. 21 Squadron RAAF
 No. 22 Squadron RAAF
 No. 23 Squadron RAAF
 No. 25 Squadron RAAF
 No. 1 Service Flying Training School
 No. 1 Air Depot
 No. 2 Air Depot
 No. 3 Bombing and Gunnery School
 Communications and Survey Flight

 Royal Air Force
 No. 6 Squadron RAF
 No. 23 Squadron RAF
 No. 25 Squadron RAF
 No. 29 Squadron RAF
 No. 41 Squadron RAF
 No. 64 Squadron RAF
 No. 65 Squadron RAF
 No. 74 Squadron RAF
 No. 208 Squadron RAF
 No. 600 Squadron RAF
 No. 601 Squadron RAF
 No. 604 Squadron RAF
 No. 607 Squadron RAF
 No. 608 Squadron RAF

Hawker Hardy

Force Publique

Royal Air Force
 No. 6 Squadron RAF
 No. 30 Squadron RAF

Southern Rhodesia Air Force
 No. 237 Squadron RAF

Hawker Hartebees

South African Air Force
 1 Squadron SAAF
 2 Squadron SAAF
 40 Squadron SAAF
 41 Squadron SAAF

Hawker Osprey

Portuguese Navy

Spanish Republican Navy

Royal Swedish Air Force

 Fleet Air Arm
 701 Naval Air Squadron
 711 Naval Air Squadron
 712 Naval Air Squadron
 713 Naval Air Squadron
 714 Naval Air Squadron
 715 Naval Air Squadron
 716 Naval Air Squadron
 718 Naval Air Squadron
 750 Naval Air Squadron
 755 Naval Air Squadron
 757 Naval Air Squadron
 758 Naval Air Squadron
 759 Naval Air Squadron
 800 Naval Air Squadron
 801 Naval Air Squadron
 802 Naval Air Squadron
 803 Naval Air Squadron
 No. 404 (Fleet Fighter) Flight
 No. 405 (Fleet Fighter) Flight
 No. 406 (Fleet Fighter) Flight
 No. 407 (Fleet Fighter) Flight
 No. 409 (Fleet Fighter) Flight
 No. 443 (Fleet Reconnaissance) Flight
 No. 444 (Fleet Reconnaissance) Flight
 No. 445 (Fleet Reconnaissance) Flight
 No. 447 (Fleet Reconnaissance) Flight

See also
Hawker Hart
Hawker Hind

References

 Halley, James J. The Squadrons of the Royal Air Force. Tonbridge, Kent, UK: Air-Britain (Historians), 1980. .
 Mason, Francis K. The British Bomber Since 1914. London: Putnam Aeronautical Books, 1994. .
 Mason, Francis K. The British Fighter since 1912. Annapolis, Maryland, USA: Naval Institute Press, 1992. .
 Mason, Francis K. Hawker Aircraft since 1920. London: Putnam Aeronautical Books, 1991. .
 Sturtivant, Ray and Balance, Theo. The Squadrons of the Fleet Air Arm. Tonbridge, Kent, UK: Air-Britain (Historians), 1994. .
 Thetford, Owen. "By Day and By Night: Hawker Hart and Hind":Operational History Part One. Aeroplane Monthly, July 1995, Vol. 24 No. 1, Issue No 267, pp. 50–57. London: IPC. ISSN 0143-7240.
 Wixey, Ken. "Hart Of The Matter:Part One - Hawker's Hart 'Family':The Hart Bomber And The Army Co-Op Audax". Air Enthusiast, No 96, November/December 2001. Stamford UK:Key Publishing. pp. 24–33.

Hawker Hart and variants
Hart and variants
Hawker aircraft